K. R. Kaushik (born 29 September 1948) is the Director General of Police (Anti-corruption bureau) of the state of Gujarat in western India. He is an IPS officer, who joined the Gujarat Police Force in 1972. He was appointed as the police commissioner of Ahmedabad during the 2002 Gujarat violence. He has also briefly served as the Director General of Police, the highest police position in the state, when the Election Commission of India appointed him as DGP during the legislative election in Gujarat in 2007. P. C. Pande, who had earlier held the post, was re-appointed as DGP after the elections by the Narendra Modi government.

References 

Indian police chiefs
Ahmedabad civic officials
Living people
1948 births